Witbank Dam is a buttress type dam located on the Olifants River in South Africa. It was established in 1971 and serves mainly for municipal and industrial water supply purposes. The hazard potential of the dam has been ranked high (3).

See also
List of reservoirs and dams in South Africa

References 

 List of South African Dams from the Department of Water Affairs

Dams in South Africa
Olifants River (Limpopo)
Dams completed in 1971